Wenkchemna Peak is located on the border of Alberta and British Columbia. It was named in 1894 by Samuel E. S. Allen.

Wenkchemna is the 10th peak in The Valley of the Ten Peaks, as they are normally numbered (left to right as seen from Moraine Lake).  It is an extension into the valley of the ridge formed by Mount Hungabee and Ringrose Peaks.

Geology

Wenkchemna Peak is composed of sedimentary rock laid down during the Precambrian to Jurassic periods. Formed in shallow seas, this sedimentary rock was pushed east and over the top of younger rock during the Laramide orogeny.

Climate

Based on the Köppen climate classification, Wenkchemna Peak is located in a subarctic climate zone with cold, snowy winters, and mild summers. Temperatures can drop below −20 °C with wind chill factors below −30 °C.

See also 
 List of peaks on the Alberta–British Columbia border
 Mountains of Alberta
 Mountains of British Columbia

Further reading 
 Brian Patton, Bart Robinson, Walks and Hikes in Banff National Park, P 103
  Tony Daffern, Canadian Rockies, PP 55, 59
 Brian Patton, Bart Robinson, Canadian Rockies Trail Guide, P 101
 Kathy Calvert, Dale Portman, Guardians of the Peaks: Mountain Rescue in the Canadian Rockies and Columbia, P 185
 Dave Birrell, 50 Roadside Panoramas in the Canadian Rockies, P 83

References 

Wenkchemna Peak
Wenkchemna Peak
Canadian Rockies